Andrei Igorov (10 December 1939 – 10 November 2011) was a Romanian sprint canoer. He specialized in the C-1 10000 m event, in which he won silver medals at the 1963 World and European Championships, as well as two European titles, in 1965 and 1967. This event was not available at the 1964 Olympics, and Igorov had to compete in the C-1 1000 m. He won a silver medal finishing 0.42 seconds ahead of the third place.

References

External links

 
 

1939 births
2011 deaths
Canoeists at the 1964 Summer Olympics
Olympic canoeists of Romania
Olympic silver medalists for Romania
Romanian male canoeists
Romanian people of Russian descent
Olympic medalists in canoeing
ICF Canoe Sprint World Championships medalists in Canadian
Medalists at the 1964 Summer Olympics
Sportspeople from Brăila